Boutique Monaco is a 117-metre, 27-storey residential skyscraper in the ward of Seocho-gu in Seoul. The working title of this building was "Missing Matrix"; it was designed by architect Minsuk Cho, and has 172 units. It was the recipient of the 2008 Silver Emporis Skyscraper Award, beating the much taller 101-storey Shanghai World Financial Center.

Film
 Up to the Sky - Missing Matrix (Boutique Monaco), Seoul. Documentary, Germany, 2012. A film by Sabine Pollmeier and Joachim Haupt, Production: Parnass Film, ZDF, arte, series: Up to the Sky.

References

External links
 Boutique Monaco Official Website

Residential buildings completed in 2008
Buildings and structures in Seoul